A national intranet is an  Internet protocol-based walled garden network maintained by a nation state as a national substitute for the global Internet, with the aim of controlling and monitoring the communications of its inhabitants, as well as restricting their access to outside media. Other names have been used, such as the use of the term "halal internet" in Islamic countries.

Such networks generally come with access to state-controlled media and national alternatives to foreign-run Internet services: search engines, web-based email, and so forth.

List of countries with national intranets

Myanmar 
Burma before 2011 used to have a separate intranet for domestic use called Myanmar Wide Web.

Cuba 
Cuba has its own state controlled intranet called national web.

North Korea 

North Korea's Kwangmyong network, dating back to 2000, is the best-known of this type of network. Cuba and Myanmar also use a similar network system that is separated from the rest of the Internet.
The network uses domain names under the .kp top level domain that are not accessible from the global Internet. As of 2016 the network uses IPv4 addresses reserved for private networks in the 10.0.0.0/8 range.

Russia 
In 2020 Russia tested internal internet known as RuNet (Internet in Russian Federation territory).

Iran 

The National Information Network of Iran works like the Great Firewall of China. In April 2011, a senior Iranian official, Ali Agha-Mohammadi announced government plans to launch its own "halal internet", which would conform to Islamic values and provide "appropriate" services. Creating such a network, similar to the North Korean example, would prevent unwanted information from outside Iran getting into the closed system. The Iranian walled garden would have its own localized email service and search engine.

See also 
 Internet censorship by country
 Intranet
 Surveillance state
 Splinternet

References 

Internet censorship
Mass surveillance